Until 1 January 2007 Ikast municipality was a municipality (Danish, kommune) in Ringkøbing on the Jutland peninsula in west Denmark.  The municipality covered an area of 294.3 km2, and had a total population of 23,283 (2005).  Its last mayor was Carsten Kissmeyer, a member of the Venstre (Liberal Party) political party. The main town and the site of its municipal council was the town of Ikast.

 Bording Parish
 Engesvang Parish
 Ikast Parish
 Isenvad Parish

Ikast municipality ceased to exist as the result of Kommunalreformen ("The Municipality Reform" of 2007).  It was merged with existing Brande and Nørre-Snede municipalities to form the new Ikast-Brande municipality.  This created a municipality with an area of 768 km2 and a total population of 39,371 (2005).  The new municipality belongs to Region Midtjylland ("Mid-Jutland Region").

External links

References  
 Municipal statistics: NetBorger Kommunefakta, delivered from KMD aka Kommunedata (Municipal Data)
 Municipal merges and neighbors: Eniro new municipalities map

Former municipalities of Denmark

fr:Municipalité d'Ikast-Brande
nl:Ikast